Paul Geraghty (born 3 May 1959, in Durban, South Africa) is a British based author and illustrator of children's picture books. He also writes teenage fiction and won the Young Africa Award for his first novel Pig.

Background 
His master read Fine Arts and English at Natal University, South Africa and holds a Higher Diploma in Education. After teaching for two years in Cape Town he took a copywriter's job in advertising. There he met John Bush, who would later go on to collaborate with him on three picture books. Since 1986 he has lived in London, UK.

Geraghty’s picture books typically centre on wildlife/environmental themes, either treated in a highly realistic manner, rich in detail, or irreverently stylised, usually illustrated in watercolour. Translated into over 20 languages internationally, his work has won various awards, including the Red House Children's Book Award for Solo in 1996.

A frequent lecturer and live illustrator on the literary circuit, he is renowned for his inspirational, if eccentric style with audiences of all ages.

He is also a musician, photographer and extensive traveller.

Picture Books 
(Illustrated in watercolour, unless otherwise stated)

	The Giraffe who Got in a Knot (Written by John Bush) (1987)
	The Cross-with-us Rhinoceros (Written by John Bush) (1988)
	Over the Steamy Swamp (1988)
	The Great Knitting Needle Hunt (1989)
	The Bungle in the Jungle (Written by John Bush) (1989)
	What on Earth was That? (1990)
	Look out, Patrick! (1990)
	Slobcat (1991)
	Monty’s Journey (1992)
	The Great Green Forest (1992)
	The Hunter (1994)
	Solo (1995)
	The Wonderful Journey (Oil on canvas) (1999)
	Tortuga (2000)
	The Hoppameleon (2001)
	Dinosaur in Danger (2004)
	Rotten & Rascal (The Two Terrible Pterosaur Twins) (Mixed media illustrations) (2006)
	Help Me! (2010)

Novels 
	Pig (1988)
	Tina Come Home (1991)

References

External links 
 Paul Geraghty website
 Video: Paul Geraghty discusses changes and inspirations
 Illustration from Dinosaur in Danger
 Illustration from The Hunter
 A Paul Geraghty Oil Painting commissioned by the military
  South African Children's Literature:Lifting The Stones of Apartheid by Beverly Naidoo, 2006

University of Natal alumni
1959 births
Living people
South African children's writers
South African children's book illustrators